751 Naval Air Squadron (751 NAS) was a Naval Air Squadron of the Royal Navy's Fleet Air Arm. It was initially active as an Observer Training Squadron from 1939 to 1944 as part of No.1 Observer School. In 1945 it had a brief existence as a trials unit, followed by a short reformation during 1947 at RAF Watton and a second longer spell there from 1951 before finally disbanding at RNAS Culdrose in 1958.

History of 751 NAS

Observer Training (1939 - 1944) 

751 Naval Air Squadron formed at RNAS Ford (HMS Peregrine), in West Sussex, on 24 May 1939, as an Observer Training Squadron and being part of No.1 Observer School. The squadron was equipped with Supermarine Walrus Amphibious aircraft.

On the 18 August 1940, a formation of Junkers Ju 87, or Stuka, dive bombers, attacked RNAS Ford as part of a large Luftwaffe force attacking airfields around Hampshire and Sussex. 28 personnel were killed and 75 wounded in the raid, which also destroyed 17 aircraft, damaged 26 more and caused significant infrastructure damage.

The following day, 751 NAS moved from Ford to RNAS Arbroath (HMS Condor), in East Angus, Scotland, then as part of the No.2 Observer Training School. The squadron remained at Arbroath for around twelve months, before moving to the Satellite station and Seaplane base at RNAS Dundee (HMS Condor II), Dundee, Angus, on the 13 August 1941, operating as a Seaplane Observer Training Squadron and continuing to use Walrus aircraft. The squadron disbanded at Dundee on the 2 May 1944.

Trials Unit (1945) 

751 NAS reformed at RNAS Machrihanish (HMS Landrail), close to Campbeltown in Argyll and Bute, Scotland, on the 22 September 1945, as a Trials Unit when 846 NAS disbanded and re-numbered as 751 NAS. The squadron was equipped with Grumman Avenger Mk.II, American torpedo bomber aircraft, however, 751 NAS only lasted just over one month and it disbanded on the 31 October 1945 at Machrihanish.

Naval Air Radio Warfare Unit (1947) 

It operated Avro Anson, a British twin-engined, multi-role aircraft, and Airspeed Oxford, a twin-engine monoplane aircraft. The squadron was active for six months, disbanding on the 30 September 1947.

Naval Air Radio Warfare Unit (1951 - 1958) 

Four years later, 751 NAS reformed again at RAF Watton, on the 3 December 1951, remaining there for around the next six years until 27 September 1957 when the squadron moved to RNAS Culdrose (HMS Seahawk), located near Helston on the Lizard Peninsula of Cornwall, England.

While at Watton, it then participated in four separate aircraft carrier deployments, between August 1953 and November 1957. From the 31 August to the 2 October 1953, a detachment from 751 NAS, was deployed on the lead ship of her class, the aircraft carrier HMS Illustrious (87), operating with Grumman Avenger ECM.6. In 1955, between the 19 February and the 15 March, a detachment spent the time operating from another lead ship of her class, the light aircraft carrier HMS Centaur (R06), again with Grumman Avenger ECM.6. In June 1955, a detachment spent approximately two weeks, from the 7 to the 23, deployed to the  light fleet aircraft carrier, HMS Bulwark (R08), again operating the Grumman Avenger ECM.6.

751 NAS disbanded on 1 May 1958 when it was renumbered as 831 Naval Air Squadron at RNAS Culdrose.

Aircraft flown

751 Naval Air Squadron has flown a number of different aircraft types, including:

Supermarine Walrus (May 1939 - May 1944)
Grumman Avenger Mk.II (Sep 1945 - Oct 1945)
Avro Anson Mk I (Mar 1947 - Sep 1947)
Airspeed AS.10 Oxford I (Mar 1947 - Sep 1947)
Supermarine Seafire F Mk XV (Jul 1947 - Sep 1947)
de Havilland Mosquito FB Mk. VI (Apr 1952 - Nov 1954)
de Havilland Mosquito PR Mk 34 (Apr 1952 - Nov 1954)
de Havilland Sea Mosquito TR Mk 33 (Apr 1952 - Nov 1954)
Hawker Sea Fury FB.11 (Aug 1952 - Mar 1956)
Fairey Firefly AS.Mk 6 (Sep 1952 - Mar 1956)
Grumman Avenger AS4 (Dec 1952 - Apr 1958)
Grumman Avenger AS5 (Dec 1952 - Apr 1958)
Grumman Avenger ECM.6 (Dec 1952 - Apr 1958)
Avro Anson Mk I (Feb 1953 - Aug 1955)
de Havilland Sea Venom ECM.21 (Jun 1957 - May 1958)

Naval Air Stations and Aircraft Carriers / Royal Air Force Stations  

751 Naval Air Squadron operated from a number of naval air stations of the Royal Navy, in Scotland and England, a number of Royal Navy aircraft carriers and a Royal Air Force station in England (Dt.= Detachment):
Royal Naval Air Station FORD (24 May 1939 - 19 August 1940)
Royal Naval Air Station ARBROATH (19 August 1940 - 13 August 1941)
Royal Naval Air Station DUNDEE (13 August 1941 - 2 May 1944)
Royal Naval Air Station MACHRIHANISH (22 September 1945 - 31 October 1945)
Royal Air Force Watton (1 March 1947 - 30 November 1947)
Royal Air Force Watton (3 December 1951 - 27 September 1957)
HMS Illustrious Dt. (31 August 1953 - 2 October 1953)
HMS Centaur Dt. (19 February 1955 - 15 March 1955)
HMS Bulwark Dt. (7 June 1955 - 23 June 1955)
Royal Naval Air Station CULDROSE (27 September 1957 - 1 May 1958)
HMS Eagle Dt. (14 November 1957 - 23 November 1957)

Commanding Officers 

List of commanding officers of 751 Naval Air Squadron with month and year of appointment and end:

1939 - 1944
Lt-Cdr J. H. Sender, RN (May 1939-Feb 1941)
Lt-Cdr F. Leach, RNVR (Feb 1941-Dec 1941)
Lt-Cdr H. Jones, RNVR (Dec 1941-Aug 1943)
Lt-Cdr D. H. Angel, RN (Aug 1943-Feb 1944)
Lt-Cdr T. E. Sargent, RD, RNVR (Feb 1944-May 1944)

1945
(unknown)

1947
Lt R. F. J. Forty, RN (Mar 1947-Sep 1947)

1951 - 1958
Lt-Cdr P. Winter, DSC, RN (Dec 1951-Mar 1952)
Lt-Cdr G. R. Woolsteon, RN (Mar 1952-Jun 1954)
Lt-Cdr W. J. Cooper, RN (Jun 1954-Jul 1956)
Lt-Cdr J. T. Williams, RN (Jul 1956-Mar 1958)
Lt-Cdr R. N. Hanks, RN (Mar 1958-May 1958)

References

Citations

Bibliography

700 series Fleet Air Arm squadrons
Military units and formations established in 1939
Military units and formations of the Royal Navy in World War II